Tribal casteism encompasses South Asian practices of social marginalisation within tribes. These practices are often overlooked by scholars and the media because of a colonial legacy that employed orientalist empiricism to construct tribes as egalitarian and structurally opposite to Hindu caste society. Indian sociologists and historians often appeal to a "tribe-to-caste continuum" that has elements of contested social evolution and miss the fluid and changing nature of tribal social organization, both internally and with regard to state recognition for affirmative action quotas—Scheduled Castes and Scheduled Tribes.

Overview
Scholars have not determined the scope of tribal casteism; there are no systematic surveys of the over 700 tribes and 2,000 tribal petitioning communities in India—a population of more than 100 million. There are specific ethnographers who either focus on tribal casteism or reference it in their work. In Himachal Pradesh, the activist-lawyer Lal Chand Dhissa detailed caste discriminations within tribes in his book The Injustices of the Constitution. He argues for central recognition of tribal casteism and the protection of "Scheduled Tribe Dalits" (Scheduled Tribes and Dalits are recognized as mutually exclusive by the Constitution of India).

Ethnographic analyses of the Gaddi tribe in Himachal Pradesh has focused on tribal casteism in the domains of ritual exclusion, Christian conversion, regional differences, and caste hiding through the Arya Samaj leading to state misrecognition and the denial of constitutionally mandated quotas. Tribal casteism is particularly harmful because it involves double marginalisation. Tribal people are often imagined as relatively primitive in the Indian collective consciousness of castes; and within these marginalised groups, there are indigenous practices of exclusion that are themselves casteist.

See also
 Tribal multiculturalism

References

Further reading
 Christopher, Stephen. 2020. "Divergent Refugee and Tribal Cosmopolitanism in Dharamshala." Copenhagen Journal of Asian Studies 38(1): 31–54.
 Christopher, Stephen. 2020. "'Scheduled Tribal Dalit' and the Emergence of a Contested Intersectional Identity." Journal of Social Inclusion Studies: The Journal of the Indian Institute of Dalit Studies 6(1): 1–17.
 Kapila, Kriti. 2008. "The measure of a tribe: the cultural politics of constitutional reclassification in North India." Journal of the Royal Anthropological Institute 14: 117–134.
 Parish, Stephen. 1996. Hierarchy and its Discontents: culture and the politics of consciousness in caste society. Pennsylvania: University of Pennsylvania Press.
 Parry, Jonathan. 1979. Caste and Kinship in Kangra. London: Routledge.
 Phillimore, Peter. 1982. "Marriage and Social Organisation among Pastoralists of the Dhaula Dhar (Western Himalaya)." PhD diss., University of Durham.
 Phillimore, Peter. 2014. "'That Used to be a Famous Village': Shedding the past in rural north India." Modern Asian Studies 48(1): 159–187.
 Wagner, Anya. 2013. The Gaddi Beyond Pastoralism: Making Place in the Indian Himalayas. New York: Berghahn Books.

Scheduled Tribes of India
Scheduled Castes
Adivasi
Reservation in India
Caste system in India
Religious discrimination in India
Social rejection